Mamburao Airport (Filipino: Paliparan ng Mamburao)  is an airport serving Mamburao, a municipality in and the capital of the province of Occidental Mindoro in the Philippines.  It is one of three airports in Occidental Mindoro.  The airport is classified as a community airport by the Civil Aviation Authority of the Philippines, the body of the Department of Transportation that is responsible for the operations of all airports in the Philippines except the major international airports. Air Juan is the only commercial airline the flies to this airport using its Cessna Caravan Seaplanes. It flies twice weekly Manila - Mamburao flights. After several months of operation, Air Juan ceased this route.

Facilities

References

External links
 

Airports in the Philippines
Buildings and structures in Occidental Mindoro
Transportation in Luzon